Lewinski is a surname of Polish origin. Notable people with the surname include:

 Ed Lewinski (1918–1962), American professional basketball player
 Eduard von Lewinski (1829–1906), Prussian general
 Erich von Manstein genannt von Lewinski (1887–1973), German field marshal in the Second World War
 Jan Lewiński (1851–1919), architect
 Jorge Lewinski (1921–2008), Polish-British photographer and soldier
 Thomas Lewinski (–1882), American architect

See also
Levinsky
Lewinsky (surname)

Further reading
 

Polish-language surnames